The Edvance Foundation is a nonprofit organization that strengthens partnerships between public and private institutions of higher education throughout the U.S., develops programs that foster greater access and choice for college-bound students, and promotes best practices in institutional operations, management, and governance. The foundation provides the foresight, expertise, clarity, resources, and ingenuity educational institutions need to deliver lasting benefits to their students, their organizations, and to the American higher education system as a whole.

Board of directors
Arthur Rothkopf, Chair
Former Senior Vice President and Counselor to the President, U.S. Chamber of Commerce; Past President, Lafayette College
Brian Mitchell, Director
Past President, Bucknell University
Lydia Logan, Director
Senior Director of Policy, The Eli and Edythe Broad Foundation

Programs
Programs administered by the foundation support its core values and capabilities through an emphasis on:
Advancing and supporting higher education
Fostering collaboration among public and private institutions of higher education
Strengthening local and regional relations between colleges and universities
Creating efficiencies that support a breadth of strategic objectives including program development, resource allocation, strategic planning, and campus facilities management
Establishing innovative, sustainable programs of regional and national significance

Community College Linkage
The Community College Linkage (CCL) is a program designed to encourage, facilitate, and support the enrollment of community college students at private colleges and universities nationwide. The program will provide counseling that enables those students to transition successfully into private four-year institutions. CCL offers a valuable resource for colleges and universities looking to diversify their student populations, extend their demographic reach, and enrich their learning environment.

Notes & References

Educational organizations based in the United States
Organizations based in Boston